Herbert Secord Clarke (September 22, 1887 – June 25, 1938) was a Canadian professional ice hockey player who played in various professional and amateur leagues, including the National Hockey Association (NHA).  Amongst the teams he played with were the Cobalt Silver Kings.

Career
Before turning professional in the TPHL and NHA with the Cobalt Silver Kings Clarke played with the University of Toronto team in the CIAU.

During the 1908–09 season, while with Cobalt, he led the TPHL in scoring alongside Haileybury's Harry Smith with 27 goals. He would finish tied for fifth in scoring during the 1910 NHA season, but retired after the season at an age of 22 despite being pursued by both the Ottawa Senators and Renfrew Creamery Kings for the 1910–11 season.

References

External links
Herbert Secord Clarke (1887–1938) Find a Grave

1887 births
1938 deaths
Canadian ice hockey centres
Cobalt Silver Kings players
Ice hockey people from Ontario
Sportspeople from Kingston, Ontario